HMS Karakatta (or Karrakatta) was an  of the Royal Navy, launched in 1889. She was part of the Auxiliary Squadron of the Australia Station from 1890 until 1903, and was sold in 1905.

Design
Sir William White designed the Sharpshooter class in 1888. They were engined with two sets of triple-expansion steam engines, two locomotive-type boilers, and twin screws.

Armament
At build the class was fitted with two QF /45-pounder guns and four 3-pounder guns. Five  torpedo tubes were fitted, and three reloads were provided.

Construction and career
Originally named Wizard, she was built by Armstrong Whitworth, Elswick, Tyne and Wear, being laid down as yard number 546 on 17 August 1888. She was launched on 27 August 1889.

Renamed Karrakatta on 2 April 1890, and commissioned for the first time in February 1891, she formed part of the Auxiliary Squadron of the Australia Station. She arrived in Sydney with the squadron on 5 September 1891, and in 1900 was reported as "employed in the protection of the floating trade in Australian waters". Lieutenant Godfrey Edwin Corbett was appointed in command in November 1900. She left the Australia Station on 4 December 1903, and paid off in April 1904.

She was sold for £1875 in July 1905 at Portsmouth.

References

Citations

Sources
Bastock, John (1988), Ships on the Australia Station, Child & Associates Publishing Pty Ltd; Frenchs Forest, Australia. 

 

1889 ships
Ships built by Armstrong Whitworth
Ships built on the River Tyne
Sharpshooter-class torpedo gunboats
Victorian-era gunboats of the United Kingdom